Martin Wiesner (born 25 December 1958) is a German former professional footballer. He made a total of 80 appearances in the Bundesliga and 187 in the 2. Bundesliga during his playing career.

References 
 

1958 births
Living people
People from Karlsruhe (district)
Sportspeople from Karlsruhe (region)
German footballers
Footballers from Baden-Württemberg
Association football midfielders
Bundesliga players
2. Bundesliga players
Karlsruher SC players
Stuttgarter Kickers players
Tennis Borussia Berlin players
FC Baden players
German expatriate footballers
German expatriate sportspeople in Switzerland
Expatriate footballers in Switzerland